Gangarampur College is a college in Gangarampur in the Dakshin Dinajpur district of West Bengal, India. The college is affiliated to University of Gour Banga,  offering undergraduate courses. The college is situated on the banks of Punarbhaba River.

Departments

Science
Chemistry 
Physics 
Mathematics
Political Science
Economics
Sociology
Philosophy
Commerce
 2000 seat of geography
Botany

Accreditation
The college is also recognized by the University Grants Commission (UGC).

See also

References

External links 
Gangarampur College
University of Gour Banga
University Grants Commission
National Assessment and Accreditation Council

Colleges affiliated to University of Gour Banga
Academic institutions formerly affiliated with the University of North Bengal
Educational institutions established in 1981
Universities and colleges in Dakshin Dinajpur district
1981 establishments in West Bengal
Gangarampur